The Crooked Banister is the forty-eighth volume in the Nancy Drew Mystery Stories series. It was first published in 1971 under the pseudonym Carolyn Keene. The actual author was ghostwriter Harriet Stratemeyer Adams.

Plot 

Nancy, Bess, and George spend an exciting weekend at a mysterious zigzag house with a crooked banister and an unpredictable robot. Nancy becomes involved in the mystery of the strange house and must locate the missing owner who is wanted by police.

Nancy Drew books
1971 American novels
1971 children's books
Grosset & Dunlap books
Children's mystery novels